Mount Brewster is a small peak (2,025 m) that rises above the general level of the central part of Daniell Peninsula and marks its greatest elevation, in Victoria Land. Named in 1841 by Sir James Clark Ross for Sir David Brewster, Scottish physicist.

See also
 List of Ultras of Antarctica

References

Further reading
 James Clark Ross, A Voyage of Discovery and Research in the Southern and Antarctic Regions, P 251 
  The National Science Foundation (US), The Hallett Volcanic Province, Antarctica, PP 11–13

Volcanoes of Victoria Land
Borchgrevink Coast
Miocene shield volcanoes